The following location in County Dublin lacks monastic connection:
Rathfarnham Priory: sometime home of the Curran family

Notes

References

See also
List of monastic houses in Ireland

Dublin
Monastic houses
Monastic houses
Monastic houses